Chico station is an intercity rail station in the South Campus Neighborhood of Chico, California. It is served by the single daily round trip of the Amtrak Coast Starlight service. The station building was constructed by the Southern Pacific Railroad in 1892; it was listed in the National Register of Historic Places in 2014. The Greyhound bus station is located adjacent to the Amtrak station.

History

The station was built by the Southern Pacific Railroad in 1892, replacing an older structure built in 1870.

The station was shown in the 1947 film Magic Town when James Stewart's character arrives in the fictional town of Grandview. During his 1952 Vice Presidential campaign, Richard Nixon was talking on the pay phone at the station when he  got the news from the campaign headquarters that he would have to respond to the Checkers issue with the 'Checkers speech'.

Passenger rail service to Chico ceased in 1957, but was reactivated when Amtrak rerouted the Coast Starlight to its current alignment in 1982. The city and the Chamber of Commerce saved the current structure from demolition through an agreement with the Southern Pacific Railroad in 1987. That same year, the depot was listed in the National Register of Historic Places as the Southern Pacific Depot. The building is also home to the Chico Art Center.

While the Butte County Association of Governments has looked in to establishment of weekday bus service from Chico to Sacramento, their plan called for the bus to depart not from the station but rather a park and ride facility on Fir Street. A different North State Intercity Bus route received TIRCP funding in 2018 and will provide weekday feeder service to Sacramento from the Chico station.

See also 
National Register of Historic Places listings in Butte County, California

References

External links

Chico Amtrak Station (USA RailGuide -- TrainWeb)

Amtrak stations in California
Former Southern Pacific Railroad stations in California
Railway stations in Butte County, California
Buildings and structures in Chico, California
Railway stations on the National Register of Historic Places in California
Carpenter Gothic architecture in California
Railway stations in the United States opened in 1870
National Register of Historic Places in Butte County, California
Railway stations closed in 1957
Railway stations in the United States opened in 1982